13 Andromedae, abbreviated 13 And, is a single, blue-white hued variable star in the northern constellation of Andromeda. 13 Andromedae is the Flamsteed designation, while it bears the variable star designation V388 Andromedae. With a typical apparent visual magnitude of around 5.75, it is dimly visible to the naked eye under good seeing conditions. At that distance, its brightness is diminished by an extinction of 0.13 magnitude due to interstellar dust. The star is moving closer to the Earth with a heliocentric radial velocity of −8 km/s.

This is a magnetic chemically peculiar star that has been assigned stellar classifications of B9 III or B9 Mn. It is a variable star of the Alpha2 Canum Venaticorum type, ranging in magnitude from 5.73 down to 5.77 with a period of 1.47946 days. The star has a high rate of spin, showing a projected rotational velocity of 75 km/s. 13 Andromedae is around 345 million years old and shines with 43 times the Sun's luminosity.

References

External links
 Image 13 Andromedae

B-type giants
Ap stars
Alpha2 Canum Venaticorum variables
Andromeda (constellation)
Durchmusterung objects
Andromedae, 13
220885
115755
8913
Andromedae, V388